"Your Seed/Bōken Rider" is a Hey! Say! JUMP single. The single was released on July 23, 2008. It peaked at #1 on the weekly Oricon charts and sold 208,113 copies in total.

Regular Edition
CD
 "Your Seed"
 "Bōken Rider" 
 "Your Seed" (Original Karaoke)
 "Bōken Rider" (Original Karaoke)

Limited Edition
CD
 "Your Seed"
 "Bōken Rider"

DVD
 "Your Seed" (PV & Making of)

Charts and certifications

Charts

Sales and certifications

References

2008 singles
Hey! Say! JUMP songs
Oricon Weekly number-one singles
Billboard Japan Hot 100 number-one singles
2008 songs
J Storm singles